Clocksbriggs railway station served the town of Forfar, Angus, Scotland from 1848 to 1964 on the Arbroath and Forfar Railway.

History 
The station opened in 1848 by the Aberdeen Railway. The station closed temporarily on 1 January 1917, reopened on 1 June 1919, closed to passengers again on 5 December 1955 and to goods traffic on 15 June 1964. The site is now a private house.

References

External links 

Disused railway stations in Angus, Scotland
Former Caledonian Railway stations
Railway stations in Great Britain opened in 1848
Railway stations in Great Britain closed in 1917
Railway stations in Great Britain opened in 1919
Railway stations in Great Britain closed in 1955
1848 establishments in Scotland
1964 disestablishments in Scotland